Roberto Guillermo Peper (June 27, 1913 – July 3, 1999) was an Argentine swimmer who competed in the 1932 Summer Olympics.

He was born and died in Buenos Aires. He was the husband of Jeannette Campbell and father of Susana Peper.

Career 
In 1932 he was a member of the Argentine relay team which finished sixth in the 4 x 200 metre freestyle relay event.

External links
profile

1913 births
1999 deaths
Argentine male swimmers
Argentine male freestyle swimmers
Olympic swimmers of Argentina
Swimmers at the 1932 Summer Olympics
Swimmers from Buenos Aires
Argentine people of Dutch descent
20th-century Argentine people